Al Scott may refer to:

Al Scott (producer) for Zeitgeist
Al Scott, see Political party strength in Georgia

See also
Albert Scott (disambiguation)
Alan Scott (disambiguation)
Alfred Scott (disambiguation)
Alexander Scott (disambiguation)
Alvin Scott (born 1955), basketball player